Rezaqoli-ye Qeshlaq Rural District is in the Central District of Nir County, Ardabil province, Iran. At the census of 2006, its population was 2,522 in 590 households; there were 2,507 inhabitants in 727 households at the following census of 2011; and in the most recent census of 2016, the population of the rural district was 2,185 in 651 households. The largest of its 13 villages was Golestan, with 417 people.

References 

Nir County

Rural Districts of Ardabil Province

Populated places in Ardabil Province

Populated places in Nir County